Rhodri Meilir (born 18 November 1978) is a Welsh actor. In 2018, he began portraying the role of Dilwyn in the BBC Three series In My Skin.

Early life
Meilir was born in Pontypool. He was educated at Ysgol Maes Garmon in Mold, and Aberystwyth University's Department of Theatre, Film and Television Studies.

Career
Best known for playing Alfie Butts in the BBC sitcom My Family, Meilir has also appeared in a number of popular television shows such as Afterlife and Terry Pratchett's Hogfather on Sky One. He has also featured in a number of films, including The Baker and the 2014 film Pride, directed by Matthew Warchus. In 2006, he appeared in the Doctor Who episode "The Runaway Bride".

He is well known on Welsh television for his roles in an extensive range of shows including Y Pris, Caerdydd, Teulu, Tipyn o Stad, Cyw and Y Gwyll. He played the lead role of Trefor the taxi driver in Gwlad yr Astra Gwyn, for which he received a BAFTA Cymru nomination as best actor in 2013, and was the original Rapsgaliwn. In 2016-2017 he appeared in a regular role in the drama Byw Celwydd.

Meilir has toured with numerous theatre companies including Theatr Genedlaethol Cymru, Theatr Fran Wen and Bara Caws.

In 2018, Meilir starred in Hidden, a crime thriller about abduction and murder, broadcast on BBC One Wales. The series is set in Wales and commenced on 6 June 2018. He said of his role: "He’s a complicated character; the result of mistreatment and violence at the hands of his own mother."

Selected theatre
 Jimmy in How My Light is Spent by Alan Harris. Directed by Liz Stevenson at the Royal Exchange, Manchester, (May 2017)

Personal life
Meilir is the Ambassador for the Children and Young People's Assembly for Wales, Funky Dragon.

References

External links
 

1978 births
Living people
Welsh-speaking actors
Welsh male television actors
Alumni of Aberystwyth University
Welsh male film actors
People from Pontypool
People from Mold, Flintshire